Antonio Valjalo (6 May 1926 – 8 July 2013) was a Chilean footballer. He played in two matches for the Chile national football team from 1953 to 1955. He was also part of Chile's squad for the 1955 South American Championship.

References

External links
 

1926 births
2013 deaths
Chilean footballers
Chile international footballers
Association football defenders
Unión Española footballers
Colo-Colo footballers
O'Higgins F.C. footballers